Francis K. (Frank) Koehn  is an American activist and politician in Northern Wisconsin. He was the first Green Party candidate to be elected to office in the United States when he was elected Bayfield County supervisor on the Lake Superior Greens ticket in 1986.  Koehn's 12 years on the Board of Supervisors (1986–1998) is one of the longest tenures in elected office for any Green Party member, and after Dave Conley (22 years) is the second longest among Wisconsin Greens. Koehn has also been active in environmental, treaty rights and human rights causes including opposition to the Crandon and White Pine mines, support of Ojibwe treaty rights, and support for the proposed Seventh-Generation Amendment to the US Constitution. Koehn has paid particular efforts to preserving Lake Superior.  In many of these causes, Koehn worked closely with Walter Bresette. He is considered a founding member of the Wisconsin Green Party and remains active in it. Koehn was also a schoolteacher in the South Shore Schools in Port Wing, Wisconsin until recently. He currently lives in Herbster, Wisconsin.

See also
Wisconsin Walleye War

Notes

External links
Midwest Treaty Network
Website of the Wisconsin Green Party

Wisconsin Greens
County supervisors in Wisconsin
People from Bayfield County, Wisconsin
Educators from Wisconsin
Living people
Year of birth missing (living people)